King of Wales was a rarely used title, because Wales, much like Ireland, rarely achieved a degree of political unity like that of England or Scotland during the Middle Ages. While many different leaders in Wales claimed the title of "King of Wales", the country was only truly united under the rule of Gruffydd ap Llywelyn from 1055 to 1063.

Rhodri Mawr has been suggested by some as the first sovereign of Wales, and the first to unite most of Wales. The modern-day territory of Wales was only fully united under the direct rule of Gruffydd ap Llywelyn from 1055 to 1063 according to historian John Davies. The native use of the title "Prince of Wales" appeared more frequent by the eleventh century as a "modernised" or reformed form of the old high kingship of the Britons. The native use of the titles ended following the killing of Llywelyn the Last, his brother, Dafydd ap Gruffydd, and Owain Glyndŵr, since then the Prince of Wales title has been used by the English and then British monarchy.

History

Before Welsh Kings 

Prior to the King or Prince of Wales title, the title King of the Britons was used to describe the King of the Celtic Britons, ancestors of the Welsh. The Brut y Tywysogion, Gwentian Chronicles of Caradoc of Llancarvan version, which was written no earlier than the mid-16th century lists multiple Kings of the Britons as a "King of Wales".

Early use of the title 

Following the departure of the Roman legions from Wales, the country had become fractured into divided territories, each with its own leaders. The first known person to actually call himself king was Rhodri Mawr (c. 820–878) and being from Wales he was by extension called the King of Wales, although he did not control all of the country. Nonetheless, he did unite much of the land under his power, thus demonstrating that it could be possible for Wales to exist as a unified political entity. Though he died in 878, the legacy of what he had accomplished was significant enough to act as motivation for future Welsh leaders to aspire to. This would eventually lead to the rule of Gruffudd ap Llywelyn (c. 1010–1063), the first true Welsh king.

Gruffydd ap Llywelyn rules all Wales 

From the smaller kingdoms of Wales eventually emerged four major powers: Powys, Gwynedd, Dyfed/Deheubarth, and Morgannwg. With Wales now developing into a more consolidated entity, it ultimately set the stage for Gruffudd ap Llywelyn in the mid-11th century.  Alliances with Anglo-Saxon dynasties and Vikings helped him unite the country, and even conquer land belonging to the English. "In 1055 he absorbed Deheubarth as well, thus becoming in effect King of Wales". John Davies states that Gruffydd was "the only Welsh king ever to rule over the entire territory of Wales... Thus, from about 1057 until his death in 1063, the whole of Wales recognised the kingship of and notably peaceful rule by Gruffudd ap Llywelyn. For about seven brief years, Wales was one, under one ruler, a feat with neither precedent nor successor." After his betrayal and death at the hands of his own men, Wales fell into civil war with other leaders seeking to fill the void of power and become king.

Gruffydd ap Llywelyn was referred to as King of Wales or Rex Walensium by John of Worcester. He was the last of a long line of paramount rulers among the insular Britons to have the title of King of the Britons bestowed upon him, and possibly the only one to truly rule over all the (independent) Britons. By this time, if not earlier, Wales was the only part of Britain remaining under Brittonic rule.

Evolution into Prince of Wales 
The native use of the title "Prince of Wales" appeared more frequent by the eleventh century as a "modernised" or reformed form of the old high kingship of the Britons. The Welsh had originally been the High Kings of the Britons up until the claim to be high king of late Romano-British Britain was no longer realistic after the death of Cadwaladr in 664. Cadwaldr was also heavily associated with the symbol of the Red Dragon of Wales.

According to Dr Sean Davies, "in these straitened circumstances, and with outside observers ridiculing the status of Welsh kings, ambitious native nobles adopted the novel title of prince, in order to set them apart from their fellow "kings"." However, the title King of Wales was later used by at least one other Welsh ruler, Owain Gwynedd (c. 1100–1170). "In his first two letters to Louis, Owain described himself as "king of Wales" and "king of the Welsh"." His direct rule was, however, limited to Gwynedd. Owain was also the first Welsh ruler to be known as Prince of Wales. He ruled over much of Northern Wales, but a lack of success in military campaigns limited his ability to extend his control. After the death of Owain Gwynedd in 1170, the mantle of paramount Welsh ruler was taken up by Rhys ap Gruffydd (c. 1132–1197), who was called "Head of all Wales" by the Brut y Tywysogion on his death in 1197. His direct rule was limited to Deheubarth. For a list of Welsh rulers upon whom titles such as these were bestowed (leading ultimately to the title Prince of Wales), see King of the Britons.

Llywelyn the Last, the last Prince of Wales, was ambushed and killed in 1282. The execution of his brother Dafydd ap Gruffydd in 1283 on the orders of King Edward I of England effectively ended Welsh independence. The title of Prince of Wales was then used by the English monarchy for the heir to the English throne. The use of this title by an English monarch has been described as a "humiliation" of Wales.

During the period 1400–1413, following a rebellion against English rule in Wales, there existed a native Prince of Wales, Owain Glyndŵr, and a Prince of Wales appointed by the English monarchy (who later became Henry V of England). The native Prince of Wales, Owain Glyndŵr, led Welsh forces against the English Prince of Wales and English rule in Wales. The eventual defeat of Glyndwr's forces effectively ended Welsh independence. Since the death of Owain Glyndŵr in 1415, the Prince of Wales title has only been held by a non-native heir to the English (and later British) monarchy.

List of "Kings of Wales" titleholders 
The following is a list of those assigned or claiming the title of King or Prince of Wales, including "Sovereigns and Princes of Wales 844–1283". Some sources suggest Rhodri Mawr as the first sovereign of Wales, as well as the first to unite most of Wales. While many different leaders in Wales claimed the title of "King of Wales" and ruled majorities of Wales, the modern-day territory of Wales was only fully united under the direct rule of Gruffydd ap Llywelyn from 1055 to 1063 according to historian John Davies.

Other uses

See also
 List of rulers of Wales
 King of the Britons
 Prince of Wales

References

 King of Wales